UPM-Sat is a series of Spanish microsatellites developed by the Technical University of Madrid (UPM), in collaboration with the Instituto Nacional de Técnica Aeroespacial (INTA), for educational, scientific and technological purposes.

UPM-Sat 1 
The UPM-Sat 1, also called UPM/LB-Sat, was launched on July 7, 1995, from French Guiana on the flight V75 of the Ariane IV-40 launcher. It weighed 47 kg. It had an operational life in orbit of 213 days, with a Sun-synchronous polar orbit at an altitude of 670 kilometers, completing one revolution around the Earth every 98 minutes.

UPM-Sat 2 
The UPM-Sat 2 project aimed to develop a satellite with a mass less than 50 kg and overall dimensions less than 0.5 m x 0.5 m x 0.6 m. The UPM-Sat 2 satellite, also called M.A.T.I.A.S., was originally scheduled to launch in 1999. It was finally launched on September 3, 2020, on the flight VV16 of the Vega rocket.

References

External links 
 UPM-Sat 1, official website of the Technical University of Madrid.
 UPM-Sat 2, official website of the Technical University of Madrid.

Technical University of Madrid
Instituto Nacional de Técnica Aeroespacial
Satellites of Spain
Communications satellites
Spacecraft launched in 1995
Spacecraft launched in 2020